Maple Mountain may refer to:

 Maple Mountain (British Columbia)
 Maple Mountain (Maine)
 Maple Mountain (New Hampshire)
 Maple Mountain (Oneida County, New York)
 Maple Mountain (St. Lawrence County, New York)
 Maple Mountain (Ontario)
 Maple Mountain (Washington)